Glandularia pulchella is a species of flowering plant in the verbena family known by the common name South American mock vervain. It is native to Brazil, Argentina, and Uruguay, and it is present elsewhere as an introduced species and roadside weed. It is an annual or perennial herb producing one or more stems growing decumbent to erect in form and hairy to hairless in texture. The rough-haired leaves are divided deeply into lobes. The inflorescence is a dense, headlike spike of many flowers up to 1.5 centimeters wide. Each flower corolla is up to 1.4 centimeters wide and white to purple in color.

External links
Jepson Manual Treatment
Photo gallery

Verbenaceae